The Beauty of Labour (Schönheit der Arbeit) was a propaganda organization of the Nazi government from the period 1934 to its eventual disbandment in 1945. One of its principal functions was workplace design and the beautification of the German work environment. Initially a propaganda machine, the SdA worked bilaterally with its counterpart organisation Strength Through Joy (KdF) to achieve overall appeasement of the general population. The organization campaigned for improved cleanliness, better hygiene, proper work attire, changing rooms, lockers, better air, and less noise in factories and other places of employment. Beauty of Labour was one of the many areas that made up the Nazi labour union, the Deutsche Arbeitsfront (DAF or "German Labour Front") and was directed by Albert Speer. 

Campaigns such as the Fight against Noise and Good ventilation in the workplace gave the Hitler-led government the ability to stimulate productivity within the workplace while simultaneously installing a sense of community and greater cordiality between the government and the German population.

References

Bibliography
 
 
 
 

Nazi Party organizations
Nazi propaganda organizations
Occupational safety and health organizations
Albert Speer